"For Your Babies" is a song by British soul and pop band Simply Red. Written by Mick Hucknall, it was released in January 1992 as the third single from the band's forth album, Stars (1991). The song reached number nine on the UK Singles Chart in February same year. It also reached the top 20 in Ireland and the top 30 in Austria and Belgium. The track was included on the band's compilation albums, Greatest Hits in 1996, Simply Red 25: The Greatest Hits in 2008 and Songs of Love in 2010. It was also featured on the band's acoustic album Simplified in a new version.

Critical reception
Larry Flick from Billboard felt that here, Mick Hucknall "offers an unusually restrained and completely effective performance on this delicately arranged R&B gem." Clark and DeVaney from Cashbox noted that the song "is set at a mellow, easy-listening pace. Following in the footsteps of their previous material, they have perfectly matched the above-average production with the soft-tone vocals." Rufer and Fell from the Gavin Report called it "the ultimate Mother's Day record delivered with loving sentimentality by Mr. Hucknall." Adam Sweeting from The Guardian named it the singer's "exquisite tear-jerking showpiece". Pan-European magazine Music & Media described it as a "very gentle, vulnerable pop ballad, thoughtfully arranged and featuring some fine Spanish acoustic guitar licks." 

A reviewer from Music Week stated that "an uncluttered and pretty ballad with no hiding place, it certainly draws a fine performance from Hucknall, full of nuances and pure, clear phrasing. A smash." Newcastle Journal deemed it as a "honest ballad". People Magazine remarked that Hucknall's singing "is still the hook in Simply Red's music, sliding gently in a pillow-soft upper register." Karla Peterson from The Press-Courier viewed it as "a tender tribute to parenthood in times of trouble". Johnny Dee from Smash Hits called it a "soulful, smoochy track", giving it four out of five.

Retrospective response
Writing for CultureSonar in 2018, Ellen Fagan felt that Hucknall "was never more appealing than in this ballad of a proud dad serenading his little child with loving hopes for his future during the sleepless days of early parenthood. Hucknall had his first baby decades after this was written, so his ability to conjure up such a scenario is deliciously prescient." musicOMH declared it as a "perfect romantic ballad". In an 2015 retrospective review, Pop Rescue complimented it as "a wonderfully gentle track, laden with piano, bass, and acoustic guitar", where the singer "takes a leisurely stroll through the lyrics."

Music video
A music video was produced to promote the single, directed by British commercial, film and music video director Andrew Morahan.

Track listings

Credits and personnel
Credits are lifted from the Stars album booklet.

Studios
 Recorded at Condulmer Recording Studio (Venice, Italy)
 Mixed at Conway Studios (Los Angeles)
 Mastered at Bernie Grundman Mastering (Los Angeles)

Simply Red
 Mick Hucknall – words, music, vocals, backing vocals, co-production
 Fritz McIntyre – additional vocals, keyboards
 Tim Kellett – keyboards
 Heitor Pereira – guitars
 Ian Kirkham – saxophone
 Gota Yashiki – drums, percussion, programs
 Shaun Ward – bass guitar

Other personnel
 Stewart Levine – production
 Daren Klein – mixing, engineering
 Sandro Franchin – assistant engineering
 Marnie Riley – assistant mix engineering
 Bernie Grundman – mastering

Charts

Weekly charts

Year-end charts

References

External links
 

1990s ballads
1991 songs
1992 singles
Black-and-white music videos
East West Records singles
Music videos directed by Andy Morahan
Pop ballads
Simply Red songs
Song recordings produced by Stewart Levine
Songs written by Mick Hucknall